Ferrid Kheder  (born 3 March 1975) is a retired French judo Olympian who placed seventh at the Olympic Games in Sydney(2000) and a former professional  mixed martial artist  who fought from 2004 to 2013.

Judo career
Kheder began training judo in 1979 at the age of four. He went on to train with the French Team from 1993 to 2001, and in the Tunisia Team from 2001 to 2004.  He won twice the Paris Grand Slam (1999 and 2000) and the Dusseldorf Grand Slam (2000 and 2002) .He won the european championship U21 in Spain (1995) and the European championship by Team (1996).He has medaled seven times in the Super World Cup (Grand Slam) and won many Opens and World Cups, he placed 3rd at the European championship in Poland (2000) and 7th at the 2000 Olympic Games.

He holds a black belt in Judo as well as a black belt in Brazilian Jiu-Jitsu.

Mixed martial arts career
In 2004 Kheder started to add Muay Thai and grappling training to his judo background to compete in MMA with Fighting Klub Team (FK TEAM).

In 2005 he moved to Australia to continue his new journey.

In 2007 while fighting in Australia, a manager from the US contacted him and recruited him to join Team Quest in California. He later became contracted under the Bellator organization.

Between September 2008 and June 2011 Kheder won 13 of his 14 fights winning 11 fight by KO or Submission and losing only a decision (28-29) to Daisuke Nakamura at M-1 Global Presents Breakthrough on August 28, 2009.

His interest in BJJ grew through his MMA career during which he had the opportunity to train with some of the worlds best BJJ players.

In 2015 he earned his black belt while living in San Diego.

Today, his focus is on teaching and sharing his extensive knowledge of the Martial Arts he loves.

He is a sixth degree Judo Black belt (IJF), a BJJ black belt , and a former Professional MMA fighter.

Xtreme Vale Todo 5 controversy
There is some question as to if Kheder's alleged victory over Hermes Franca was rigged by a promoter, Lu Dwyer, during the Xtreme Vale Todo event that took place on December 19, 2010. In addition to the fight's announcer, all three judges, and the referee had scored the bout in favor of Franca. Regardless of the judges' scores, Dwyer declared Kheder the victor, and another promoter raised Kheder's hand in victory after the referee refused to do so.

There is a potential conflict of interest due to the fact that Kheder is primarily sponsored by Dwyer and her business J & L Irrigation. Dwyer sponsors "Team FK" by paying his living expenses and taking a percentage of his winnings.

Days after his controversial decision win Kheder posted on his Facebook page that Dwyer overturned the fight result to a "No Contest" and suggested a 5 round rematch, presumably in the same promotion.

The rematch never happened since Hermes Franca found guilty in the sexual abuse of a child under 14 years of age in 2012 and has been sentenced to 42 months in prison.

Bellator

In 2010 Kheder was supposed to fight in Bellator's Lightweight Tournament but due to a case of appendicitis, he has been forced out of the eight-man field and has been replaced by WEC veteran James Krause.

In 2011 Kheder was 1 kg heavy 
and refused to step onto the scale to be weighed and was instead removed from the tournament which allowed Josh Shockley to take Kheder's place.

Judo achievements

Mixed martial arts record

|-
| Loss
| align=center | 22–11 (1)
| Vincent del Guerra
| TKO (punch)
| PFC 5 – Clash of the Titans
| 
| align=center | 2
| align=center | 2:12
| Marseille, France
|
|-
| Win
| align=center | 22–10 (1)
| Adrian Rodrigues
| Submission (neck crank)
| Shidokan Costa Rica – Live Super Fights
| 
| align=center | 1
| align=center | 4:50
| San Jose, Costa Rica
|
|-
| Loss
| align=center | 21–10 (1)
| Ronys Torres
| TKO (punches)
| Amazon Forest Combat 2
| 
| align=center | 1
| align=center | 0:22
| Amazonas, Brazil
| 
|-
| Loss
| align=center | 21–9 (1)
| Lim Hyun-Gyu
| TKO (punches)
| PXC – Pacific Xtreme Combat 27
| 
| align=center | 1
| align=center | N/A
| Mangilao, Guam
|
|-
| Loss
| align=center | 21–8 (1)
| Aloisio Barros
| TKO (doctor stoppage)
| FF – Fight Fever 4
| 
| align=center | 3
| align=center | 1:27
| Luxembourg City, Luxembourg
|
|-
| Loss
| align=center | 21–7 (1)
| Yoshiyuki Yoshida
| TKO (punches)
| Fighting Marcou Arena 2
| 
| align=center | 1
| align=center | N/A
| Palavas-les-Flots, Herault, France
|
|-
| Loss
| align=center | 21–6 (1)
| Zorobabel Moreira
| Decision (unanimous)
| Dare Championship 1/11
| 
| align=center | 3
| align=center | 5:00
| Bangkok, Thailand
| 
|-
| NC
| align=center | 21–5 (1)
| Hermes França
| NC (decision overturned by promoter)
| Xtreme Vale Todo 5
| 
| align=center | 3
| align=center | 5:00
| Cartago, Costa Rica
| 
|-
| Win
| align=center | 21–5
| Steve Berger
| TKO (punches)
| MFL 3 – Mixed Fight League
| 
| align=center | 2
| align=center | 1:16
| Laval, Quebec, Canada
|
|-
| Win
| align=center | 20–5
| Randall Jimenez
| Submission (rear-naked choke)
| Saint-Tropez Promotions – Xtreme Vale Todo 4
| 
| align=center | 2
| align=center | 2:50
| Tamarindo, Costa Rica
|
|-
| Win
| align=center | 19–5
| Rudier Fuentes
| Submission (armbar)
| Vale Tudo Montecarlo
| 
| align=center | 2
| align=center | 4:20
| Guanacaste, Costa Rica
|
|-
| Win
| align=center | 18–5
| Rogelio Zuniga
| Submission (armbar)
| Vale Tudo Montecarlo
| 
| align=center | 1
| align=center | 2:12
| Guanacaste, Costa Rica
|
|-
| Win
| align=center | 17–5
| Randall Jimenez
| TKO (retirement)
| Saint-Tropez Promotions – Extreme Valetodo Tamarindo
| 
| align=center | 1
| align=center | 5:00
| Tamarindo, Costa Rica
|
|-
| Loss
| align=center | 16–5
| Daisuke Nakamura
| Decision (unanimous)
| M-1 Global: Breakthrough
| 
| align=center | 3
| align=center | 5:00
| Kansas City, Missouri, United States
| 
|-
| Win
| align=center | 16–4
| Jeffry Lopez
| Decision (unanimous)
| Fite Nite – Guerreros en la Torre
| 
| align=center | 3
| align=center | 5:00
| Costa Rica
|
|-
| Win
| align=center | 15–4
| Graydon Tannas
| KO (punches)
| UCW 15 – Massacre
| 
| align=center | 3
| align=center | 0:18
| Winnipeg, Manitoba, Canada
|
|-
| Win
| align=center | 14–4
| Calvett Huzinger
| Submission
| C3 Fights – C3 Fights
| 
| align=center | 1
| align=center | 0:55
| Newkirk, Oklahoma, United States
|
|-
| Win
| align=center | 13–4
| Drew Fickett
| KO (punches)
| C3 Fights – Knock-Out Rock-Out Weekend
| 
| align=center | 3
| align=center | 2:02
| Clinton, Oklahoma, United States
|
|-
| Win
| align=center | 12–4
| Elton Brown
| Submission (rear-naked choke)
| MMA Costa Rica – Bushido 2008
| 
| align=center | 1
| align=center | 3:15
| San Pedro, Costa Rica
|
|-
| Win
| align=center | 11–4
| Alejandro Solano Rodriguez
| Decision (unanimous)
| FN – Fite Nite
| 
| align=center | 3
| align=center | 5:00
| Desamparados Canton, Costa Rica
|
|-
| Win
| align=center | 10–4
| Vince Guzman
| Submission (rear naked choke)
| AF 2 – Apocalypse Fights 2
| 
| align=center | 2
| align=center | 2:05
| Palm Springs, California, United States
|
|-
| Win
| align=center | 9–4
| Douglas Noear
| Submission (strikes)
| C3 Fights – Clash in Concho
| 
| align=center | N/A
| align=center | N/A
| Concho, Oklahoma, United States
|
|-
| Loss
| align=center | 8–4
| Pedro Santos
| Decision (unanimous)
| Jungle Fight 11
| 
| align=center | 3
| align=center | 5:00
| Rio de Janeiro, Brazil
|
|-
| Loss
| align=center | 8–3
| Paulo Thiago
| Decision (unanimous)
| Jungle Fight 10
| 
| align=center | 3
| align=center | 5:00
| Rio de Janeiro, Brazil
|
|-
| Win
| align=center | 8–2
| Rory McDonell
| Decision (unanimous)
| UCW 11 – Hell in the Cage
| 
| align=center | 3
| align=center | 5:00
| Winnipeg, Manitoba, Canada
|
|-
| Win
| align=center | 7–2
| Christos Petroutsos
| TKO (punches)
| Shooto Belgium – New Batch
| 
| align=center | 1
| align=center | 1:02
| Charleroi, Belgium
|
|-
| Loss
| align=center | 6–2
| Tommy Truex
| Decision (unanimous)
| SF 21 – Seasons Beatings
| 
| align=center | 3
| align=center | 5:00
| Portland, Oregon, United States
|
|-
| Win
| align=center | 6–1
| Mike Neufeld
| TKO (punches)
| UCW 10 – X-Factor
| 
| align=center | 2
| align=center | N/A
| Winnipeg, Manitoba, Canada
|
|-
| Loss
| align=center | 5–1
| Pono Pananganan
| Decision (split)
| GPG – Gracie Proving Ground
| 
| align=center | 3
| align=center | 5:00
| Honolulu, Hawaii, United States
|
|-
| Win
| align=center | 5–0
| Will Cunningham
| KO (punch)
| Cage Fighting Championship 1
| 
| align=center | 2
| align=center | 2:49
| Sydney, Australia
|
|-
| Win
| align=center | 4–0
| Laurent Poirier
| Submission (armbar)
| DF – Dumbea Fights
| 
| align=center | 1
| align=center | N/A
| Noumea, New Caledonia
|
|-
| Win
| align=center | 3–0
| Dan Harper
| KO (knee)
| DF – Dumbea Fights
| 
| align=center | 2
| align=center | N/A
| Noumea, New Caledonia
|
|-
| Win
| align=center | 2–0
| Gavin Murie
| Submission (armbar)
| XFC 12 – Oktoberfist
| 
| align=center | 1
| align=center | N/A
| Australia
|
|-
| Win
| align=center | 1–0
| Fred Sanchez
| Submission (armbar)
| DY – Dojo Yaburi
| 
| align=center | 1
| align=center | 3:00
| Carmaux, Franca
|

References

External links
 
 
 Videos on Judovision.org
Website: www.ferridkheder.com

1975 births
Living people
French male mixed martial artists
Tunisian male mixed martial artists
Lightweight mixed martial artists
Welterweight mixed martial artists
Mixed martial artists utilizing judo
Mixed martial artists utilizing Brazilian jiu-jitsu
French male judoka
Tunisian male judoka
Olympic judoka of France
Judoka at the 2000 Summer Olympics
French practitioners of Brazilian jiu-jitsu
Tunisian practitioners of Brazilian jiu-jitsu
People awarded a black belt in Brazilian jiu-jitsu
French sportspeople of Tunisian descent
French expatriate sportspeople in the United States
Tunisian expatriate sportspeople in the United States